Francis Damiano Damasi (born 1 June 2001) is a Tanzanian long-distance runner.

In 2017, he competed in the junior men's race at the 2017 IAAF World Cross Country Championships held in Kampala, Uganda.

In 2018, he competed in the boys' 3000 metres at the 2018 Summer Youth Olympics held in Buenos Aires, Argentina.

In 2019, he competed in the senior men's race at the 2019 IAAF World Cross Country Championships held in Aarhus, Denmark. He finished in 61st place.

References

External links 
 

Living people
2001 births
Place of birth missing (living people)
Tanzanian male long-distance runners
Tanzanian male cross country runners
Athletes (track and field) at the 2018 Summer Youth Olympics